Bojanji Vrh is a small settlement northeast of Muljava in the Municipality of Ivančna Gorica in central Slovenia. The area is part of the historical region of Lower Carniola. The municipality is now included in the Central Slovenia Statistical Region.

Name
Bojanji Vrh was attested in written sources as Boyansperg in 1323, Poyansperg in 1324, Geyensperg in 1338, and Woyensperg in 1350, among other spellings.

References

External links

Bojanji Vrh on Geopedia

Populated places in the Municipality of Ivančna Gorica